The 2017–18 Northwestern Wildcats women's basketball team represented Northwestern University during the 2017–18 NCAA Division I women's basketball season. The Wildcats were led by 10th-year head coach Joe McKeown. They played 15 of their 16 home games, including an exhibition game, at Beardsley Gym on the nearby campus of Evanston Township High School, along with a home game at Allstate Arena while their home arena, Welsh-Ryan Arena, undergoes renovations. They were members of the Big Ten Conference. They finished the season 12–20, 4–12 in Big Ten play to finish in 11th place. They defeated Wisconsin in the first round of the Big Ten women's tournament before losing to Iowa.

Previous season 
The Wildcats finished the 2016–17 season 20–11, 8–8 in Big Ten play to finish in a tie for eighth place. They defeated Iowa in the second round of the Big Ten women's tournament before losing to Ohio State. Despite having 20 wins, they were not invited to a postseason tournament first time since 2013.

Roster

Schedule and results

|-
!colspan=9 style=| Exhibition

|-
!colspan=9 style="background:#431F81; color:#FFFFFF;"| Non-conference regular season

|-
!colspan=9 style=| Big Ten regular season

|-
!colspan=9 style= |Big Ten Women's Tournament

Rankings

See also
2017–18 Northwestern Wildcats men's basketball team

References

Northwestern Wildcats women's basketball seasons
Northwestern
Northwestern Wild
Northwestern Wild